Volvariella volvacea (also known as paddy straw mushroom or straw mushroom) is a species of edible mushroom cultivated throughout East and Southeast Asia and used extensively in Asian cuisines. They are often available fresh in regions they are cultivated, but elsewhere are more frequently found canned or dried. Worldwide, straw mushrooms are the third most consumed mushroom.

Cultivation 
Straw mushrooms are grown on rice straw beds and are most commonly picked when immature (often labeled "unpeeled"), during their button or egg phase and before the veil ruptures. They are adaptable and take four to five days to mature, and are most successfully grown in subtropical climates with high annual rainfall. No record has been found of their cultivation before the 19th century.

Nutrition 
One cup (182 g) of straw mushrooms is nutritionally dense and provides  of food energy, 27.7 µg selenium (50.36% of RDA), 699 mg sodium (46.60%), 2.6 mg iron (32.50%), 0.242 mg copper (26.89%), 69 µg vitamin B9 (Folate) (17.25%), 111 mg phosphorus (15.86%), 0.75 mg vitamin B5 (pantothenic acid) (15.00%), 6.97 g protein (13.94%), 4.5 g total dietary fiber (11.84%), and 1.22 mg zinc (11.09%).

Identification 
In their button stage, straw mushrooms resemble poisonous death caps, but can be distinguished by several mycological features, including their pink spore print (spore prints of death caps are white).  The two mushrooms have different distributions, with the death cap generally not found where the straw mushroom grows natively, but immigrants, particularly those from Southeast Asia to California and Australia, have been poisoned due to misidentification.

References

External links 

 Straw Mushroom
 http://www.indexfungorum.org/Names/SynSpecies.asp?RecordID=307802 
 http://www.indexfungorum.org/Names/NamesRecord.asp?RecordID=307802

Pluteaceae
Chinese edible mushrooms
Fungi described in 1786
Fungi in cultivation
Fungi of Asia